Killer Loop (also known as MagForce Racing for Dreamcast) is a futuristic racing game released in 1999-2000. It was developed by VCC Entertainment and published by Crave Entertainment.

Demo release
The Hawaii level of this game was released as a demo with the tune 'Coppermine' from the soundtrack to accompany it. The demo was featured on an Official UK PlayStation Magazine free demo disc (number 52) in December 1999. This helped to advertise the game for the PlayStation console.

Development team
Some of the developers who worked on this game (including Tammo 'kb' Hinrichs), whose names appear in the default high scores, went on to form the Farbrausch group of the Demoscene.

Reception

The PC version of Killer Loop received favourable reviews, while the PlayStation version and MagForce Racing received mixed reviews, according to the review aggregation website GameRankings. Jeff Lundrigan of NextGen gave both console versions negative reviews in two separate issues, saying of the PlayStation version: "Six tracks and six vehicles spread over four classes with no two-player mode – you do the math. Although a competent effort, this is the definition of a placeholder title, and you've seen it all before" (#61, January 2000); and later of MagForce Racing: "There's nothing here you haven't seen done before and done better" (#69, September 2000).

Notes

References

External links
 
 

1999 video games
Arcade video games
Crave Entertainment games
Dreamcast games
Science fiction racing games
Multiplayer and single-player video games
PlayStation (console) games
Video games developed in Germany
Windows games